A neckerchief (from neck (n.) + kerchief), sometimes called a necker, kerchief or scarf, is a type of neckwear associated with those working or living outdoors, including farm labourers, cowboys and sailors.  It is most commonly still seen today in the Scouts, Girl Guides and other similar youth movements. A neckerchief consists of a triangular piece of cloth or a rectangular piece folded into a triangle.  The long edge is rolled towards the point, leaving a portion unrolled.  The neckerchief is then fastened around the neck with the ends either tied or clasped with a slide or woggle.

Naval

Neckerchiefs worn by sailors are shaped like a square, and are folded in half diagonally before rolling, with rolling occurring from the tip of the resulting triangle to its hypotenuse. Either neckerchief is then placed on the wearer's back, under or over the shirt collar with the ends at the front of the wearer.  The rolled ends then pass around the neck until they meet in front of it, where they are secured together, either with a knot, such as a reef knot or a slip knot, or with a rubber band or other fastener (called a woggle or neckerchief slide) and allowed to hang.  A slip knot (vs. a simple reef or square knot) will give way if the neckerchief gets caught and is thus less likely to choke the wearer.

Sailors in the United States Navy have worn a rolled black neckerchief since the American Civil War. It is currently part of the men's service dress uniform for junior enlisted sailors as well as the women's summer dress uniform.

Scouting

The Scouting movement makes the neckerchief part of its uniform.  A generally ceremonial item, the neckerchief is taught to be a practical wilderness item in the Scouting tradition.  The neckerchief, unrolled, is designed to be the perfect size for use as a triangular bandage for first aid.

The origin of the Scouting neckerchief seems to be in Robert Baden-Powell's participation in the Second Matabele War in 1896; where he worked with Frederick Russell Burnham, an American-born scout employed by the British Army. Baden-Powell copied Burnham's practical style of dress, including "a grey-coloured handkerchief, loosely tied around the neck to prevent sunburn". When Baden-Powell launched the Scout Movement with the book Scouting for Boys in 1908, he prescribed a neckerchief or scarf as part of the Scout uniform, which he stated was "very like the uniform worn by my men when I commanded the South African Constabulary". He continued; "Every Troop has its own scarf colour, since the honour of your Troop is bound up in the scarf, you must be very careful to keep it tidy and clean." Initially, Scout neckerchiefs were tied with a variety of knots, but the use of a "woggle" or slide, originated in the United States in the early 1920s and quickly spread around the Scouting world.

Each Scout group would have a neckerchief of different design and colours. In most countries each Scout Troop uses its own colour neckerchief. The colours are usually the "Troop Colours" which may have a particular historical significance to the troop or to the local community.

At Scouting camps and jamborees these neckerchiefs represent units, subcamps or the camp as a whole. Fun scarves are also used as memorabilia at Scout events and country scarves are often traded at international gatherings

In Canada, while most groups use colour neckerchiefs, there is also an optional alternate universal pattern tartan neckerchief: white plaid on red for Scouts, gold plaid on dark green for Cubs. Alternating thick and thin lines of the plaid spell out "CANADA" in Morse code.

In Australia, Queensland uses a single maroon necker for the whole state, while the other states allow groups, Venturer Units and Rover Crews to choose their own necker. Region and Branch Teams also have their own neckers.

In Hungary, as well as the Hungarian diaspora communities in countries such as the US, the necktie color is national rather than distinctive for each troop, being light blue for ages 10 and younger and grass green for ages 11 and up.

In other countries individual patrols are identifiable by their neckerchiefs and so troops may have many different neckerchiefs all at once. In both of these cases the neckerchief and its colours are an issue of identity, and become emblematic of a troop or a patrol.

Neckerchiefs can also have important ceremonial functions in Scouting, for example, the 1st Gilwell Scout Group present a special neckerchief on completion of the Wood Badge.

Some Traditional Scouting Associations use a square neckerchief folded over, as Scouts originally wore.

Political youth movements

In Nazi Germany, the Hitler Jugend, Deutsches Jungvolk and Bund Deutscher Mädel all wore a black neckerchief as part of their uniform, usually folded under the shirt collar. It has been suggested that it was copied from Scouting, which was banned in Germany in 1935.

In many Communist states, members of the Pioneer movement wore a red neckerchief which was sometimes worn without the rest of the uniform. This continues at present in China and Vietnam.

See also
 Ascot
 Bandanna
 Cravat
 Fichu
 Friendship knot
 Kerchief
 Neal Manufacturing Company
 Red scarf
 Scarf
 Scout Scarf Day

External links

References

Scarves
Scouting uniform
Maritime culture